Tokyo Express: The Guadalcanal Naval Campaign – 1942 is a board game published in 1988 by Victory Games.

Contents
Tokyo Express is a game in which the solitaire player is the American commander facing the Japanese off Guadalcanal in 1942.

Reception
Mike Siggins reviewed Tokyo Express for Games International magazine, and gave it 3 stars out of 5, and stated that "In view of the rather expensive price tag and the hard work required, I remain doubtful of its overall merit. On balance, Tokyo Express is one for the hardened solitaire player with an interest in naval matters."

Reviews
Fire & Movement #67, 70
Jeux & Stratégie #56

References

Board games introduced in 1988
Victory Games